Sewadjenre Nebiryraw (also Nebiriau I, Nebiryerawet I) was an ancient Egyptian pharaoh of the Theban-based 16th Dynasty, during the Second Intermediate Period.

Reign
On the Turin Canon he is credited with a 26-year-long reign and was succeeded by his namesake Nebiryraw II, who may have been his son. All the seals issued by Nebiryraw were made of clay or frit rather than the usual steatite which implies there were no mining expeditions dispatched to the Eastern Desert region of Egypt during his reign. Two seals of this king were found at Lisht which at the time was part of the Hyksos realm; this finding may demonstrate diplomatic contacts between the Theban dynasty and the Hyksos during Nebiryraw's reign, although this is uncertain.

Attestations
Besides the mention in the Turin Canon and the aforementioned seals, Nebiryraw I is mainly known from the Juridical Stela, a well known administrative document dated to his regnal Year 1, now at the Cairo Museum (JE 52453). 
Also in Cairo (JE 33702) there is a copper dagger bearing his throne name, discovered by Flinders Petrie in a cemetery at Hu, in late 1890s. Nebiryraw is also depicted along with the goddess Maat on a small stela which is part of the Egyptian collection located in Bonn.

Nebiryraw's throne name Sewadjenre (along with the epithets "good god" and "deceased") appears on the base of a bronze statuette of the god Harpocrates now in Cairo (JE 38189), along with other royal names, two of them – Ahmose and Binpu – apparently belonging to princes of the 17th Dynasty which would replace the 16th Dynasty shortly thereafter. The statuette also mentions a "good god Neferkare, deceased" which is generally believed to be the throne name of Nebiryraw's purported son and successor, Nebiryraw II. The statuette is clearly non-contemporary, however, since the cult of Harpocrates was introduced during the Ptolemaic period i.e. about 1500 years after the people named on the statuette had lived.

References

External links

scarab of Nebiriau I

17th-century BC Pharaohs
Pharaohs of the Sixteenth Dynasty of Egypt
17th-century BC deaths
Year of birth unknown